A-Z or A to Z may refer to:
 English alphabet

Other uses
 A–Z (album), by Colin Newman
 A to Z (TV series), 2014 American television series on NBC
 A to Z, or Geographers' A–Z Street Atlas
 A-Z, collection of sportswear made in collaboration with the Swedish footballer Zlatan Ibrahimović
 Geographers' A-Z Map Company, British map publisher

See also
 A2Z (disambiguation)
 
 
 AZ (disambiguation)
 Hyundai Atos, also called Hyundai Atoz, a city car